The Australian High Commissioner to Tonga is an officer of the Australian Department of Foreign Affairs and Trade and the head of the High Commission of the Commonwealth of Australia in the Kingdom of Tonga. The position has the rank and status of an Ambassador Extraordinary and Plenipotentiary and the high commissioner resides in Nukuʻalofa. The high commissioner, since March 2019, is Adrian Morrison.

List of High Commissioners

References

Tonga
 
Australia